Rosie Kmita (born 27 July 1994) is an English former footballer who played for Watford.

Early and personal life
Her twin sister Mollie is also a footballer. She is of Indian descent.

Club career
Kmita began her career at Tottenham Hotspur but spent time in 2012 playing college soccer with Saint Leo Lions and joined Brighton in December 2013. In 2016, having returned to Tottenham, she decided to leave for a second time to focus on her education. After spending 2016–17 in the lower divisions with Cambridge and Gillingham, she signed for FA WSL 2 club London Bees in August 2017.

In October 2017 Kmita joined West Ham United, linking up again with her twin sister Mollie who had played alongside Rosie at most of her previous clubs. When West Ham were awarded an FA Women's Super League franchise in summer 2018, Kmita was one of only two existing players to be retained and offered a professional contract. On 29 May 2019 West Ham announced that Kmita had departed the club.

In August 2019, Kmita rejoined London Bees in the FA Women's Championship.

In October 2020, Kmita signed for Watford in the FA Women's National League South.

At the end of the 2021–2022 season, Rosie retired from football to focus on other ventures.

References

External links
 
 Profile at Saint Leo Lions
 Profile at Tottenham Hotspur F.C.
 Profile at West Ham United F.C.

1994 births
Living people
English women's footballers
Women's Super League players
FA Women's National League players
Women's association football forwards
West Ham United F.C. Women players
Brighton & Hove Albion W.F.C. players
Tottenham Hotspur F.C. Women players
London Bees players
Saint Leo University alumni
Expatriate women's soccer players in the United States
Gillingham L.F.C. players
Twin sportspeople
English twins
Identical twins
English people of Indian descent
British sportspeople of Indian descent
British Asian footballers
Watford F.C. Women players
Women's Championship (England) players